= Standing of Zoya =

The Zoya's Standing in Kuibyshev is a Soviet urban legend and Orthodox Christian myth.

The narrative of "Zoya's Standing in Kuibyshev" began circulating within Orthodox and media discourse during the 1990s. By the 2000s, it had gained recognition as an Orthodox legend associated with the miracles of Saint Nicholas. Over time, the story became a notable element of local folklore in Samara, often regarded as being rooted in historical events.

== Plot ==
The story centers around an alleged incident that originated in oral rumors from Kuibyshev (now Samara), Russia. According to the legend, in 1956, a young atheist woman named Zoya hosted a New Year’s Eve party. When her fiancé, Nikolay, failed to arrive, she began to dance with an icon of Saint Nicholas. Despite attempts by her friends to stop her, Zoya reportedly declared, "If there is a God, let Him punish me." At that moment, a sudden clap of thunder and a flash of lightning were said to have filled the room, after which Zoya was found paralyzed—standing motionless and rigid, still holding the icon.

== Motif ==
The motif of a blasphemous dancer being struck by divine punishment, often described as becoming "stone-like," has been documented in Russian folklore since at least the late 19th century and saw renewed circulation, around 1919. However, the version known as "Zoya's Standing" from 1956 has become the most widely recognized and enduring adaptation of this narrative. It draws upon a traditional narrative framework centered on the punishment of sacrilege and has been preserved in oral tradition and folklore, even during periods when religious content was suppressed in print. The legend's persistence and popularity may have been influenced by its resonance with earlier religious narratives that emerged as a form of cultural resistance to the Soviet Union’s anti-religious campaigns.
